Livonia High School may refer to:

Livonia High School (Louisiana) in Livonia, Louisiana
Livonia High School (Michigan) in Livonia, Michigan
Livonia High School (New York) in Livonia, New York